Zgărdești is a commune in Teleneşti District, Moldova. It is composed of three villages: Bondareuca, Ciofu and Zgărdești.

Personalities
 Emanoil Catelli

References

Communes of Telenești District